Eduardo Cornejo (born November 19, 1981) is a baseball coach and former infielder, who is the current head baseball coach of the Cal State Northridge Matadors. He played college baseball at Riverside Community College in 2001 before transferring to Oklahoma. He played professionally from 2003 to 2008.

Playing career
Cornejo grew up in San Bernardino, California, where he attended Jurupa Valley High School. Cornejo would go on to play college baseball for the Riverside Community College. As a freshman at Riverside Community College in 2001, Connejo had a .368 batting average, a .438 on-base percentage (OBP), and a .492 slugging percentage (SLG), with three home runs. As a sophomore in 2002, he transferred to the University of Oklahoma, Cornejo batted .325 with a .411 SLG, 17 doubles, and 31 RBIs. As a junior in 2003, he batted .393 with a .509 SLG, 2 home runs, and 49 RBIs.

Cornejo was drafted by the Oakland Athletics in the 13th round of the 2003 Major League Baseball draft. He signed with the Athletics on June 6, 2003, forgoing his senior year of eligibility in college. He would play the next five years in the Athletics organization, never advancing above Triple-A. He was released, and signed with the Colorado Rockies organization where he would finish out the 2008 season. He announced his retirement in 2009.

Coaching career
Cornejo began his coaching career in 2011, as an assistant for the UC Riverside Highlanders. He would join the staff of the UC Santa Barbara Gauchos the following season. He left the Gauchos following the 2018 season to join the staff of the San Jose State Spartans. He would join Dave Serrano's staff on the Cal State Northridge Matadors for the 2020 season. When Serrano announced that he would be retiring following the 2022 season, Cornejo was named the head coach of the Matadors beginning with the 2023 season.

Head coaching record

References

External links
Cal State Northridge Matadors bio

1981 births
Living people
Cal State Northridge Matadors baseball coaches
Oklahoma Sooners baseball players
San Jose State Spartans baseball coaches
Riverside City Tigers baseball players
UC Riverside Highlanders baseball coaches
UC Santa Barbara Gauchos baseball coaches
Colorado Springs Sky Sox players
Midland RockHounds players
Modesto A's players
Sacramento River Cats players
Stockton Ports players
Tulsa Drillers players
Vancouver Canadians players
American expatriate baseball players in Canada
California State University, San Bernardino alumni